Nola juvenis is a moth in the family Nolidae. It was described by William Jacob Holland in 1893. It is found in Gabon.

References

Endemic fauna of Gabon
Moths described in 1893
juvenis